Lake LeAnn is a unincorporated community and census-designated place (CDP) in Hillsdale County in the U.S. state of Michigan.  The CDP has a population of 1,571 at the 2020 census.  It is located in Somerset Township and includes the namesake Lake LeAnn and several other lakes that are part of the Grand River headwaters.

U.S. Route 12 runs through the southern part of the community, leading east-northeast  to Ypsilanti and west-southwest  to Coldwater.

Demographics

References 

Census-designated places in Hillsdale County, Michigan
Census-designated places in Michigan
Unincorporated communities in Michigan
Unincorporated communities in Hillsdale County, Michigan